Eriberto V. Loreto (c. 1932 – 21 June 2005), also known as the Honorable Berting Loreto, was a mayor of Baybay, Leyte, Philippines and Representative of the 5th Districts of Leyte.

References

External links
Eriberto V. Loreto's obituary

People from Leyte (province)
Place of birth missing
Mayors of places in Leyte (province)
Members of the House of Representatives of the Philippines from Leyte (province)
1930s births
2005 deaths